The collared crescentchest (Melanopareia torquata) is a species of bird in the family Melanopareiidae. It is found in Brazil and Paraguay.

Taxonomy and systematics

The crescentchests (genus Melanopareia) were previously included in family Rhinocryptidae, the tapaculos. A 2010 publication confirmed earlier work and created their present genus. The International Ornithological Congress (IOC) recognizes two subspecies of the collared crescentchest, the nominate Melanopareia torquata torquata and M. t. rufescens. The South American Classification Committee of the American Ornithological Society (AOS) and the Clements taxonomy consider the double-collared crescentchest (M. bitoquata) to be a third subspecies.

Description

The nominate subspecies' back and rump are brown and the underparts buff. The crown of the head is gray brown. It has a narrow white supercilium edged with black, a rufous "collar" on the back of the neck, and a black band across the breast. Subspecies M. t. rufescens is almost identical but its crown is reddish brown.

Distribution and habitat

The collared crescentchest is found primarily in central Brazil but also occurs in far northeastern Paraguay. It inhabits cerrado, a biome characterized by a mix of savannah and woodlands. It prefers wetter open areas and avoids disturbed areas.

Behavior

Feeding

The collared crescentchest's diet has not been described but the species is assumed to be insectivorous.

Breeding

Little is known about the collared crescentchest's breeding phenology. Its nest is a globe of dry grass and leaves placed near the ground. Two eggs are laid and both sexes incubate them and care for nestlings.

Vocalization

Both sexes of collared crescentchest sing year round, usually from atop a low shrub. The song is "a series of 3-6 loud, resonant 'chip' notes" . Its call is "a penetrating churr" .

Status

The IUCN has assessed the collared crescentchest as being of Least Concern. "Despite widespread degradation of cerrado habitat, the population of Collared Crescentchest is believed to be relatively stable throughout its large range."

References

collared crescentchest
Birds of the Cerrado
collared crescentchest
Taxonomy articles created by Polbot